Hiroshi Matsumoto may refer to:

 Hiroshi Matsumoto or "Finish" Hiroshi, video game designer who produced the original Street Fighter as well as the Art of Fighting series
 Hiroshi Matsumoto (Kurt Vonnegut character), a character from the novel Hocus Pocus
 Dai Matsumoto (born 1959), also credited Hiroshi Matsumoto, Japanese voice actor
 Roy Matsumoto (1913-2014), American Nisei translator during World War II
 Hiroshi Matsumoto (born 1942), Japanese engineer and president of RIKEN, former president of Kyoto University